The Minister of Water Resources of Nigeria is a cabinet official in the Nigerian Federal Executive Council.

The Minister is assisted by the Permanent Secretary of the Ministry of Water Resources, a career civil servant. The current Minister of Water Resources is Engineer Suleiman Hussein Adamu and the permanent secretary is Dr. Musa Wen Ibrahim  At various times the ministry has been amalgamated with the Federal Ministry of Agriculture.

In April 2010 when Goodluck Jonathan appointed Sheikh Ahmed Abdullah as Minister of Agriculture, the Ministry of Water Resources became separate from the Ministry of Agriculture.

Ministers of Water Resources

See also

Federal Ministries of Nigeria
Nigerian Civil Service

References 

Lists of government ministers of Nigeria
Water ministries
2010 establishments in Nigeria